True Colors is the second studio album by American singer Cyndi Lauper, released on September 16, 1986, by Portrait Records. The album spawned several commercially successful singles as "True Colors", "Change of Heart", and "What's Going On" reached the top 20 of the Billboard Hot 100, with the first two charting within the top five. The album was produced by Lauper herself together with Lennie Petze.

Upon its release, the album received generally positive reviews from music critics. The album earned Lauper several awards and accolades, including two nominations at the 29th Annual Grammy Awards. True Colors peaked at number four on the Billboard 200 chart. The album is Lauper's second best-selling release with around seven million copies worldwide.

Background and production 
By the end of 1985, Lauper was established as one of the best-selling artists in the world. Her first studio album was certified 4 times platinum by RIAA and received a diamond certification in Canada for sales in excess of 1 million copies, making her the first singer to achieve such a feat at that time. According to Billboard magazine the music industry was eyeing the singer's next steps anxious to know if she could maintain the success of her debut.

In her autobiography, the singer says that she initially planned that Rick Chertoff, who produced She's So Unusual, would produce what would become her second album, however, the experience with him was problematic and she changed her mind, likewise she refused to produce the album with Rob Hyman since he was affiliated with Chertoff. The album was then produced by her and Lennie Petze. Lauper said that the songs of the album are a way to say: "Have the courage of your convictions and love yourself a little", and "not to be so hard on yourself". In addition to composing most of the songs on the album, the singer also produced it. 

The title song, written by Billy Steinberg and Tom Kelly, has been covered by many other artists, and was used as the theme song for the 1988 Summer Olympics, the 2003 Rugby World Cup and for Kodak cameras and film.

In 2010, the song was also featured on the soundtrack of Sex and the City 2. True Colors was reissued in a Japanese exclusive limited edition box set 11-track digitally remastered CD album.

Critical reception

The album received favorable reviews from music critics. In a retrospective assessment, Eugene Chadbourne from AllMusic website gave the album three and a half stars  out of five and wrote that while the album is "ambitious" and "some of the stretches really pay off" some of its aspects "date badly" like the "highly reverberated and artificial sounding drums and keyboards" which "were really popular at the time". He concluded that despite those problems "there really wasn't that much music recorded by this artist during her most popular period, so fans will no doubt want to own it all." Robert Christgau from The Village Voice gave the album a B MINUS and wrote that the first side of the LP consists of "cheap sentiment" and is "disheartening" and that "the second isn't much more than a relief". He finalized the review writing that "girls just want to have money--and no fun changes everything". Jimmy Guterman from Rolling Stone magazine gave the album a favorable review and wrote that Lauper's voice "sounds more comfortable at any given moment on True Colors than she did on all of She's So Unusual" and that the album "seems to indicate her extreme ease in her new surroundings" and that "she's found a new sense of peace — or at least she's heading in that direction" but he concludes that "her uneasiness gave her early work much of its spark; what places True Colors a notch below her debut is that Cyndi Lauper just isn't that unusual anymore."

Le Guide du CD/FNAC of France, gave the album between 4-5 Stars, "“The second album by the craziest redhead of American Pop, True Colors follows the huge hit album, She’s So Unusual. Inhabiting the youthful energy that characterizes her, Cyndi Lauper reuses the recipe for success of her first album, with a touch of maturity, makes this opus an accomplished album. Her cover of “What’s Going On,” by Marvin Gaye, and the hits “True Colors” and “Change Of Heart,” propels the album and confirms the influence of the artist.”

Commercial performance
In the United States, True Colors has been certified double platinum by the RIAA and peaked at number four on the Billboard 200. It topped the Australian chart for four weeks and, in Japan, outsold She's So Unusual, although that was not the case in most countries. The album produced the singles "True Colors" (No. 1 Billboard Hot 100), "Change of Heart" (No. 3), "What's Going On" (No. 12), and "Boy Blue" (No. 71). Each single had a music video although the video for "Boy Blue" was just a live performance from her Zenith concert in Paris. According to Lauper's official website, the album was certified 4× Platinum in Australia and Platinum in Italy. The album sold around 7 million copies worldwide.

Track listing

Personnel 

 Cyndi Lauper – lead vocals, arrangements, backing vocals (4, 6, 7, 10), jam box (7), Emulator voice (10)
 Jeff Bova – keyboards (1, 3, 5, 8, 9, 10), arrangements (1, 3, 5, 8, 9, 10)
 Peter Wood – keyboards (2, 4, 5, 6), arrangements (2, 4, 6, 9), additional keyboards (3), synthesizer bass (7)
 Jon Goldberger – sound effects (7)
 Nile Rodgers – guitars (1)
 John McCurry – guitars (2, 3, 4, 8, 9, 10)
 Rick Derringer – guitars (5, 8)
 Adrian Belew – guitars (6), arrangements (6)
 Robert Holmes – guitars (6)
 Neil Jason – bass guitar (2, 4, 6, 9)
 Jimmy Bralower – LinnDrum programming, arrangements (1, 2, 5, 7-10), percussion (4, 7), jam box (4, 10)
 Anton Fig – drums (2, 6)
 Stephen Broughton Lunt – arrangements (3)
 Lennie Petze – arrangements (3, 5, 6, 7, 10), percussion (7), backing vocals ( 10)
 The Bangles – backing vocals (1)
 Billy Joel – backing vocals (2)
 Angela Clemmons-Patrick – backing vocals (4, 5)
 Ellie Greenwich – backing vocals (5)
 Aimee Mann – backing vocals (8)
 Pee Wee Herman – guest operator (9)

Production
 Cyndi Lauper – producer, art direction
 Lennie Petze – producer
 David Wolff – executive producer
 Brian McGee – engineer, mixing
 Jon Goldberger – assistant engineer
 Tim Kramer – assistant engineer
 Dave O'Donnell – assistant engineer
 Jason Corsaro – additional mixing
 George Marino – mastering at Sterling Sound (New York, NY).
 Jude Wilder – product manager 
 Holland Macdonald – art direction, design
 Annie Leibovitz – cover photography
 Bruce Ando – inner sleeve photography 
 Patrick Lucas – hair stylist, make-up 
 Ralph Scibelli – hair colorist 
 Laura Wills – stylist

Accolades 

|-
|rowspan="4"|1987
|"True Colors"
|Grammy Award for Best Female Pop Vocal Performance
|
|-
|"911"
|Grammy Award for Best Female Rock Vocal Performance
|
|-
|"True Colors"
|MTV Video Music Award for Best Female Video
|
|-
|"What's Going On"
|MTV Video Music Award for Best Cinematography
|

Charts

Weekly charts

Year-end charts

Certifications and sales

References

Bibliography
 

1986 albums
Cyndi Lauper albums
Portrait Records albums